Paul Norman Connew (born 1946) is a British former newspaper editor.

Born in Coventry, Connew attended King Henry VIII Grammar School, an independent school in the city, followed by the LSE. He entered journalism working for the Coventry Express, then moved to the Coventry Evening Telegraph. He later moved to London to work for the Daily Mirror and was the Mirror Group's US Bureau chief until joining the Murdoch organisation in the US before returning to London.  He became Deputy Editor of the News of the World before returning to the Mirror as Deputy Editor.  He edited the Sunday Mirror for a short period starting in 1994, and subsequently worked as a consultant for Express Newspapers and TalkSport.

Connew was formerly married to television presenter Lowri Turner during which period he became a house husband, but the couple, who have two sons, separated after 10 years in 2002, and divorced in 2004.  Connew subsequently worked as Director of Communications for the Sparks charity, and as a judge for the British Press Awards.

References

1947 births
Living people
British newspaper editors
People educated at King Henry VIII School, Coventry
People from Coventry